Disturbing the Peace is a 2020 neo-western action thriller film directed by York Shackleton and starring Guy Pearce. The film follows a police officer who must fight back against a violent outlaw motorcycle club that takes over his small town. The film was poorly received on release.

Plot 
After accidentally wounding his partner during a hostage situation, Texas Ranger Jim Dillon moves to the small town of Horse Cave, Kentucky, where he works as an unarmed police officer assisted by Deputy Matt. Learning of his former partner's death, falls into a deep depression, eased by Catie, a café server and part-time preacher. 

One day, a motorcycle gang led by violent criminal Diablo (nicknamed "Scorpion") arrives in Horse Cave, seeking to rob the town's bank and ambush an armored car set to arrive in the town. When Diablo and his gang take over Horse Cave, Jim arms himself and fights back.

Cast
 Guy Pearce as Jim Dillon
 Devon Sawa as Diablo
 Kelly Greyson as Catie Reynolds
 Michael Sirow as Matt
 Jacob Grodnik as Jarhead
 Dan Southworth as Steve
 Michael Bellisario as Pyro
 Branscombe Richmond as Big Dog
 Dwayne Cameron as Diesel
 Barbie Blank as Amanda
 Jay Willick as Alex

Reception
According to Metacritic, which sampled six critics and calculated a weighted average score of 34 out of 100, the film received "generally unfavorable reviews".

Glenn Kenny of RogerEbert.com gave the film one star, calling the film a "dull-as-dishwater, paint-by-numbers cinematic hiccup with no discernible reason for being."

Guy Pearce named Disturbing the Peace one of his worst films, calling it "abysmal".

References

External links
 

2020 films
2020s vigilante films
2020 action thriller films
American crime action films
American action thriller films
American crime thriller films
Neo-Western films
Outlaw biker films
2020s English-language films
2020s American films